Final league standings for the 1987 Western Soccer Alliance season.

History
Prior to the season, the Edmonton Brick Men left the league to join the new Canadian Soccer League.  This left the Alliance with six teams, which retained its regular season single table standings, but added a post-season playoff to determine the league champion for 1987.  The San Diego Nomads won both the regular season and playoff titles.

League standings

Playoffs

Bracket

Wild Card

Final

Points leaders

Honors
 MVP: Brent Goulet
 Leading goal scorer: Joe Mihaljevic
 Leading goalkeeper: Anton Nistl
First Team All League
Goalkeeper: Anton Nistl
Defenders: Steve Boardman, Barney Boyce, Daryl Green, Robbie Zipp
Midfielders: Jadir Henrique, George Pastor, Geoff Wall
Forwards: Brent Goulet, Tim Martin, Joe Mihaljevic

Second Team All League
Goalkeeper: Mike Lane
Defenders: Marcelo Balboa, Arturo Velazco, Eric Biefeld, Chris Wentzien
Midfielders: Steve Black, John Hamel, Richard Torres
Forwards: Scott Benedetti, John Gerard, John Sissons

References
The Year in American Soccer - 1987
1987 Western Soccer Alliance

Western Soccer Alliance seasons
3

nl:Amerikaans voetbalkampioenschap 1987